Trigonoptera transversefasciata is a species of beetle in the family Cerambycidae. It was described by E. Forrest Gilmour in 1949. It is known from Indonesia, and possibly Papua New Guinea.

References

Tmesisternini
Beetles described in 1949